Kuivajõgi is river in Estonia in Harju County. The river is 35 km long. It runs from Pususoo into Pirita river.

Some parts of Kuivajõgi is protected as "protection area of Kuivajõe stream bed".

See also
List of rivers of Estonia

References

Rivers of Estonia
Harju County